Isles may refer to:

Places
British Isles, often referred to as "the Isles" 
Kingdom of the Isles, a medieval realm comprising the Hebrides, the islands of the Firth of Clyde, and the Isle of Man

People
 Carlin Isles (born 1989), American rugby sevens player

Arts, entertainment, and media
 Isles (Wild Belle album), debut studio album by duo Wild Belle
 Isles (Bicep album), second studio album by duo Bicep
 Isles FM, a local radio station operating from Stornoway in the Outer Hebrides, Scotland

Other uses
 British Isles naming dispute
 Isles class trawler, a class of naval trawler used by the Royal Navy, Royal Canadian Navy, and Royal New Zealand Navy
 ISLES project, a study on renewable energy potential off the coasts of western Scotland and Ireland

See also 
 Isle (disambiguation)
 New York Islanders, a professional ice hockey team that is part of the National Hockey League (NHL)